Institute of Sindhology is one of the major resources on the history of Sindh. It was the first research institution of its kind, and brought Sindhology to the forefront of international research. Sindhology refers to knowledge about Sindh. The history and culture of Sindh has been shaped by the Indus River.  This lifeline of Sindh brings minerals and soil from the Himalayas to the region, then flows into the Arabian Sea at the Indus River Delta located in Sindh. These factors define the scope of Sindhology: the study of antiquities, the relics, the history, and the culture both of ancient and modern Sindh, with particular reference to Sindhi society and literature. The institute provides a repository of this knowledge in the form of a research-oriented center of learning.

History
The history of the institute goes back to the establishment of the Sindhi Academy in 1962 by the University of Sindh. The objective was to develop a facility to archive books, manuscripts, and research papers from past and present. Another objective was to promote and publish research about Sindh in the Sindhi language in addition to other languages such as Arabic, English, Persian and Urdu. The research was to be promoted in all Pakistani universities.

This was also the first time when Sindhology and its scholars were given well-deserved international attention.

In 1964, the nomenclature and the status of the Sindhi Academy were changed to the Institute of Sindhology to work on the similar patterns of Indology and Egyptology. The institute was to encourage further historical research on the Indus Valley civilization as well as contemporary living in Sindh.

The institute was provided with a small room at the old campus of Sindh University in Hyderabad. On 10 December 1972 the foundation stone of the new building was laid just off the Super Highway in Jamshoro, adjacent to Indus river. The three-storey building, located 12 kilometers from Hyderabad and 150 km from Karachi was inaugurated in 1978. The construction is an amalgamation of the Islamic and Buddhist architectures. Internally, the building is decorated with local Hala tile-work, with two arms accommodating the Research Library and Administration Block. The central dome houses the Anthropological Research Centre (Museum), Art Gallery, Film and Photographic Sections and Audio-visual Section. In 2015 International children’s films festival was held in Sindhology.

In 1987, an extension was built in celebration of the institute's Silver Jubilee to house the Bookshop facilities. Over the years, institute has transformed itself into one of the leading research institutes in Pakistan.

Research
Being affiliated with an academic institution (Sindh University), the institute contributes to the scientific research and academic studies in the subject of Sindhology. The first major initiative to bring he subject to international attention was a series of surveys to identify the sites of major anthropological and archaeological research across the province, carried out in cooperation with the Smithsonian Institution between 1967-71. There were also cooperations with UNESCO to explore the Sindhology aspects of the major Indus valley Civilization sites across Sindh. Research and academic scope of the institute have broadened since then. These and many other subsequent research contributions of the institute brought it to the list of internationally recognised research centres of the world.

Museum

Within the institute, the Anthropological Research Center and Sindh Arts Gallery is responsible for the maintenance of the museum. The centre provides attractions both for research scholars and general public. Artifacts on display in the museum represent the history and demography of the region. The collections contain archaeological material, wood-work, thread-work, metal-work, leather-work, pottery, jewellery, coins, armaments, photographs, and paintings that have been collected since the 1970s.

The museum space has been divided into various sections named as general, coins, archaeological, ethnological, ethno-musical, photographic, and Indus-painting galleries respectively. There is a special gallery devoted to prominent personalities that contains portraits of more than 175 eminent writers, scholars, educationists, social workers, Philanthropists, politicians, lawyers, freedom fighters, spiritual leaders and public figures. Special corners are devoted for people such as Quaid-e-Azam Muhammad Ali Jinnah, Allama I.I. Kazi, Hassan Ali Affendi, Pir Hussamuddin Rashdi, Syed Gulam Mustafa Shah, Muhammad Usman Diplai, and Zulfiqar Ali Bhutto. There are also and specific galleries for Benazir Bhutto and N.A Baloch, as well as Mir Talpur's Court.

Prominent artefacts include the harmonium on which Ahmed Ghulamali Chagla composed the National Anthem of Pakistan; the first Sindhi Typewriter, manufactured in 1926; and the statue of Rai Bahadur Odhoudas Chhabria, founder of Odhoudas Hospital of Shikarpur.

The work is ongoing for the collection, preservation and conservation of anthropological, historical and cultural objects and specimen. Field surveys are also conducted in villages and remote areas of Sindh to access the rare articles.

Music gallery
The ethno-musical gallery comprises sections on performing arts, sounds, and films.

Sindhi music with its original form and rhythm has withstood the test of time. Especially, the Sindhi folk tunes continue to enrich the traditions and customs of the people of rural areas and attracts the attention of urban dwellers. This aspects makes the Sindhi music research and preservation an integral part of the regional cultural heritage. Hence, the Institute of Sindhology has devised innovative ways to preserve this.

The special unit of the institute visits remote villages, recording the various items of Sindhi music, folklore, folk tales and tunes played on local musical instruments. The collection has been gradually growing, and is made available on tapes and cassettes in its original form and shape.

Library
The institute boasts a research library with many corners named after prominent Sindhi scholars. The Research section of the library continues to archive and document the regional heritage. The work started with compilation and publication of catalogues, bibliographies, directories and periodical literature. This resulted in the development of a directory of Sindhi writers; a source book on prominent personalities of Sindh; and, a bibliography of Sindhi books. The library archives have served as primary sources for many of the prominent publications on Sindhi culture.

Publications

As the institute is mainly concerned with the culture and civilization of Sindh through the ages, a special Bureau of Production, Publication and Translation has been set up to highlight significant achievements through publications. More than 185 books have been published in Sindhi, English, Urdu, Arabic and Punjabi languages. The publication of research work keeps special focus on various aspects of Sindh. There are also two Bi-annual journals in published in English and Sindhi languages under the titles of Sindhological Studies and Sindhi Adab (Sindhi literature) respectively. Some of the major publications are:
 Sindhi lekhkan–ji Directory - 1974, (A directory of the writers of Sindhi Language).
 Chapial Sindhi Kitaban–ji Bibliography 1947-1973 - 1976. (A bibliography of Sindhi Books published during 1947-1973).
 Qalmi Nuskhan-jo-Tashree Catalogue - 1980, (Catalogue of Manuscripts available in research library of the Institute).
 Chapial Sindhi Kitaban–ji-Bibliography 1973-1979, 1980 (A Bibliography of Sindhi Books published during 1973-1979).
 Newsletter of the Institute of Sindhology (Activities of the Institute).

Notes

See also
 Sindhology
 Sindhi Adabi Board
 Sindhi Language Authority
 Sindhi-language media in Pakistan

References
 Abbas, S.N. and Fernea, E.W. (2002). The Female Voice in Sufi Ritual: Devotional Practices of Pakistan and India. University of Texas Press. .
 Allana, G.A. (1978). A Detailed Report of the Activities and Achievements Made by the Institute of Sindhology. University of Sind.
 Allana, G.A. (ed.) (1982), Folk Music of Sind. Institute of Sindhology, University of Sind.
 Gill, K. and Smith, D.L. (1982). International Research Centers Directory. Gale Research Co. 
 Myers, H. (1993). Ethnomusicology. Macmillan Publishers. .
 University of Sind (1977). Sindhological Studies. vol. 1-9. Institute of Sindhology. Jamshoro
 Yusuf, M. (1975). Sind Quarterly. Shah Abdul Latif Cultural Society.

External links
 Institute of Sindhology
 University of Sindh

Science and technology in Pakistan
Sindhology
Education in Pakistan
Research institutes in Pakistan
Universities and colleges in Sindh
History of Sindh
University of Sindh
1962 establishments in Pakistan
Research institutes established in 1962